Marco Sanudo was a Lord of Gridia (a fief in Andros).

Ancestry
He was a son of Marco II Sanudo, third Duke of the Archipelago, and wife, and brother of William I Sanudo, fourth Duke of the Archipelago.

Marriage and issue
He married ... and had Guglielmazzo Sanudo, Lord of Gridia.

References

 Ancestry of Sultana Nur-Banu (Cecilia Venier-Baffo)

People from the Duchy of the Archipelago
Marco
People from the Cyclades
Year of birth unknown
Year of death unknown
14th-century Greek people
History of Andros